Khurja is a city (and a municipal board) in Bulandshahr district in the Indian state of Uttar Pradesh. It is situated around 20 km from Bulandshahr, 85 km from Delhi. Khurja supplies a large portion of the ceramics used in the country, hence it is sometimes called The Ceramics City. The city is also famous for its special sweet, known as "khurchan".

The principal inhabitants of Khurja are the Pashtuns, mainly members from the Kheshgi Dynasty of Timur's army.

The name Khurja is derived from the Urdu word kharija meaning, cancelled or condemned, as the revenue for this town was waived because this land included many swamps and the agricultural possibilities were rare.

Khurja is now famous for its ceramics. With over 500 factories producing ceramic works, its skyline is dotted with chimneys.

Geography 
It has an average elevation of 197 metres (646 foot).

Demographics 
As per provisional data of 2011 census, Khurja urban agglomeration had a population of 142,636, out of which males were 75,384 and females were 67,252. The literacy rate was 72%.

This compares with the 2001 India census, when Khurja had a population of 98,403. Males constituted 53% of the population and females 47%. Khurja had an average literacy rate of 57%, lower than the national average of 60.5%: male literacy was 65%, and female literacy was 55%. In Khurja, 16% of the population was under 6 years of age.

History 
The history of Khurja pottery goes back to around 14th century, when some retreating (wounded) soldiers and commanders from Timur's army decided to remain. They had officially established Khurja as a town. These men were mainly from the imperial Kheshgi Dynasty of the Mughal Empire, descendants of the Kheshigs, who were senior officials throughout the Empire.

A number of these soldiers were potters and they brought this craft with them. Starting with red clay pottery they moved on to blue glaze and on red clay articles with a white engobe, painted floral designs with cupric oxide and applying a soft glaze containing glass and borax etc.

During World War II, ban was imposed on various metals for making household utensils and import of ceramic goods was drastically curtailed. To meet the demand of ceramic wares mainly for war hospitals, the Government of Uttar Pradesh established a ceramic unit. After the war, the factory was closed in 1946 due to lack of demand of its products. The factory was equipped with three small kilns, two chimneys and three ball mills. Instead of closing the factory completely the Government of Uttar Pradesh converted it into a Pottery Development Centre.

Industry 
The development activities of U.P. Small Industrial Corporation Ltd. resulted in setting up of UPSIC Potteries Ltd. in 1976–77. There was a widespread complaint about the efficiency of the UPSIC Potteries Ltd., primarily because of high costs. The Government of Uttar Pradesh set up a panel in Nov.1990 to examine the working of the corporation and to consider the proposal of the passing of the commercial activities back to the Pottery Development Centre (Local Office of Directorate of fisheries.)

Though an industrial region, Khurja lacks the infrastructure for good industry by European standards. Since there are often power cuts lasting around eight hours, all factories and most homes have private generators. The municipality water supply is insufficient or everybody's need so many have water pumps to extract groundwater.

Higher education 

NREC College - Originally called Natthimal Ramsahay Edward Coronation, and now called Natthimal Ramsahay Educational Courses, it is one of the oldest colleges in India and offers courses up to PhD level including bachelor and master degrees along with LLB and B.Ed. It has also conducted NCC training programs for several decades. The College is affiliated to Meerut University and is one of the largest institutes of that university. 

AKP (PG) College - Arya Kanya Pathshala Post Graduate College is a girls' college offering graduate and post graduate degrees.  The College is affiliated to Meerut University. The subjects offered for the degree are: - Graduate: Hindi, English, Sanskrit, Economics, History, Home Science, Music, Political Science - Post Graduate: Hindi and Political Science.

Seth Gangasagar Jatia Polytechnic - The Polytechnic provides diploma in various fields e.g. Electrical, Mechanical, Civil, Glass & Ceramic Engineering etc. It is the only institute in Uttar Pradesh which facilitates diploma engineering in Glass and Ceramic Engineering.

Vaidya Yagyadutta Sharma Ayurvaidik Mahavidyalaya - The college provides education in practice of ancient Indian medicine Ayurveda. It offers a Degree course in Ayurvedic Medicine and Surgery,

After Varanasi, Khurja is the largest educational centre in India for the study of Sanskrit language. It has many Sanskrit colleges, such as:
 Radha Krishna Sanskrit Mahavidayalaya
 Seth Ganga Sagar Sanskrit Vidyalaya
 Sanskrit Manishi

Secondary Education
Khurja also has several government Secondary Education colleges including JAS Inter College, AKP (Girls) Inter College, SMJEC Inter College, Mahadevi (Girls) Inter College, Dayanand (High School) Vidyalaya, and Rifah-e-Aam Inter College.

Markets and fairs 
Khurja is a small town, with shops open until 21:00 in the Bindawala Chowk and Tareenan. There are many small markets which are important for the residents. Some markets are: Anaj mandi,  Bindawala Chawk, Sabzi Mandi (town's biggest and main Vegetable Market), subhash road, Shaheed Dataram marg, Gandhi Road, Raniwala Chawk, Kabadi Bazar (timber and hardware market), Jewar Adda, Moodha-Kheda, Bajaja Bazar (town's biggest textile market), Nayi Basti, Shaheed Dataram Chowk, Bus Adda (Bus Terminus) etc. The city has a cyber market called Sri Ram Complex, near NREC Degree College.

The weekly market called Budh Bazar or The Wednesday Market is popular, There is Sunday(Itwaar Bazar) market also on Navalty Road and the surrounding area is closed to traffic to become a pedestrian zone.

Khurja annually holds a town fair called Ramlila during the festive season of Diwali which goes through the whole festive season and each day of the festival there is theatrical portrayal of the religious stories by various drama groups along with the town's biggest fair, the location of this fair is called the Panchvati which is mainly a group of agricultural farms which is transformed into the fair ground during the season. The second biggest annual fair of Khurja is held during the Hindu festival of Navratri after the establishment of a new temple Nav Durga Shakti Mandir.

Heritage buildings 
(Devi mandir)
Khurja has a beautiful countryside with old buildings and houses along the road. You can find houses more than 100 years old in many parts of the town which are considered as the heritage of the town but now are the victims of negligence. Some of the famous buildings are: Lala Mewaram ka Kamra (the room of Mr. Mewaram, is taken over by some residents), Seth Gangaram Bhawan (which now has been converted into a banquet hall), the building of J.A.S. Inter college is also said to be a piece of art and Diwan JI Ka Mandir Near by Padam Singh gate it is very old Temple like 100-150 year old.

Khurja Super Thermal Power Project 
Towards diversification of the company into other energy sectors, THDCIL has entered into a MoU on 31 December 2010 with Govt. of U.P and UPPCL for setting up 2 x 660 MW Super critical Thermal Power Project in Tehsil Khurja, District Bulandshahar, U.P. About 1,200 acres of land was acquired by UPSIDC earlier at Khurja for industrial use which shall be utilized for construction of the project. As per MOU, GoUP / UPPCL will assist in transfer of this land.

Khurja Logistic Park 
Khurja is a meeting point of eastern and western dedicated freight rail corridor. Arshiya International Ltd's upcoming FTWZ (Free Trade and Warehousing Zone) in Khurja is strategically located connecting the Western and Eastern freight corridors with the manufacturing hub of India in the NCR. These special zones offer customized warehousing facilities to help add value or store, before organized shipment. As part of a fully integrated infrastructure, Arshiya plans to additionally invest in creating a dedicated Rail Terminal with the FTWZ in Khurja that would allow pan-India connections for its customers through its Rail Infrastructure service.

How to get to Khurja 
Khurja being a significant town is linked by rail on the Delhi – Calcutta line and via the old GT Road to many major cities in India. There are two train stations, Khurja Junction which is on the main Delhi – Calcutta line and Khurja City which serves to district headquarter Bulandshahr & Meerut.

Khurja can be reached by road or train. A drive from Delhi on a direct route has heavy traffic and takes about two and a half hours. Time can be saved by taking the expressway from Delhi to Noida, then the Dankaur station road to Sikandrabad, which is 37 km from Khurja.

Khurja has three bus terminals: Bus Adda; which is the main bus terminus, Jewar Adda; the second terminus and Pahansu Adda; the third terminus. The latter 2 terminals are named after their locations and the routes of buses which they provide. Apart from these Bus terminals, this town has two railways stations one of which is the Khurja Junction (the main station linking Khurja with the major routes of the country) and the other is called Khurja City(a station established for most of the local routes to take off the rail traffic from the main junction).

External links 
 Bulandshahar district website

References 

Cities and towns in Bulandshahr district
Cities in Uttar Pradesh
Khurja